Fred Thomas Koury Sr. (May 2, 1913 – March 8, 1985) was an American of Lebanese descent who was best known as a professional wrestler under the name ”Wild Bull” Curry. He is recognized as the originator of the hardcore style predating legends such as The Sheik, Abdullah the Butcher, and Bruiser Brody. Curry's tumultuous career spanned five decades of in-ring action.

Career

Early career
At the age of sixteen Curry joined the circus in order to help provide for his four brothers and sisters. His job at the circus was that of the “tough man” who took on all comers from the audience in a fight. He had 65 straight wins without anyone going past one 5-minute round. Then, in his twenties, Curry became a policeman in his hometown of Hartford, Connecticut, where he put his “tough man” background to good use in the streets, quickly earning him a reputation for toughness. It has been claimed that on one occasion a wild steer bull broke out of the Hartford stockyard and ran wild in the streets. Curry grabbed the bull by the horns and managed to wrestle it to the ground, however it is likely this was in fact nothing more than a fictional story created by wrestling promoters to give a reason for his nickname of “Wild Bull” that stuck with him for the rest of his life.

Later on in the 1930s, Curry began wrestling in Detroit under promoter Adam Weissmuller (uncle of Johnny Weissmuller) who also trained him for his professional career. Curry stayed in Detroit for several years developing his brutal, hardcore style of wrestling that made him a top name in the territory. Curry was so well known that he even faced legendary heavyweight pro boxer Jack Dempsey in an exhibition match in 1940. Years later Curry would often claim that he knocked Dempsey out in the match but the truth is that Curry was stopped in the second round.

1950s and 1960s
In the early part of the 1950s Bull Curry relocated to Texas to work. Curry's combination of unpredictable violence, unique look and intensity made Curry a big star in Texas more or less immediately upon arrival. Curry's brawling style made him a success but it also kept the promoters from giving him the “main” title of the territory despite being the biggest draw in the territory. Instead of letting Bull Curry win the top title of the Texas territory the bookers created a brand new title to match Bull Curry's Hardcore style of wrestling: the NWA Texas Brass Knuckles Championship which Bull Curry won in a tournament final over Danny McShain on March 6, 1953. Between 1953 and 1967 “Wild Bull” Curry personified the Texas Brass Knuckles Championship as he held it 20 times defeating such names as Fritz Von Erich, Tony Borne, Waldo Von Erich, Louie Tillet, Killer Karl Kox and Brute Bernard for the title. In 1953 Curry would also briefly hold the Texas version of the NWA World Tag Team Championship with Lucas Pertano as well as the NWA Texas Heavyweight Championship for three weeks but soon focused solely on the Brass Knuckles Title.

In the 1960s Bull Curry's son Fred Thomas Koury, Jr. took up wrestling under the name "Flying" Fred Curry. Unlike his father Fred was a clean cut, high flying face but the two Currys did team on a regular basis especially early in the younger Curry's career. The two won the NWA International Tag Team Championship in 1964 and held it until 1966 as well as beating Nikolai and Boris Volkoff for the Ohio version of the NWA World Tag Team Championship.

Later in his career Fred Curry struck out on his own more and more trying to get away from his father's legacy of rule-breaking and violence to establish a legacy of his own. Fred's attempts to get out of his father's shadow never caused any problems between the two Currys.

Controversial persona
One of the trademarks of Bull Curry was his “wildman” look with bushy eyebrows, maniacal facial expressions and insane eyes that could scare the crowd just by looking at them. In one case he scared a girl at ringside so badly she had to be carried from the ring in terror. The wild look coupled with his wild brawling style made Bull Curry one of the most hated rule-breakers in wrestling, he was so hated in places that riots broke out more than once as irate fans attacked Curry in the ring.

1955: a match between Curry and Ray McIntyre resulted in more than a 140 fans being taken to the hospital after a riot broke out.
1956: Curry was jumped by a fan who was displeased with Curry's brutal treatment of local star George Becker. Curry broke the fans jaw with a single punch.
1958: During a match with Pepper Gomez in Galveston, Texas a fan struck Bull Curry with an iron pipe. Curry chased the fan out of the ring, catching up with him in the balcony where he beat him up.
1968: While wrestling Emile Dupreé in Worcester, Massachusetts a fan jumped in the ring and jumped on Curry's back. Curry punched the fan so hard that he was reportedly unconscious for two days.
Year unknown: During a match in Texas Curry got a bucket of yellow paint dumped over his head by a fan.
Late sixties:  During a televised match, Curry used a cinder block on his opponent.  The man went into the hospital for stitches.  Curry was arrested and sentenced to jail for his actions.  The only time he was allowed out was to wrestle, so for the next four weeks of televised matches, he was escorted to and from the ring in handcuffs by police, being cuffed and returned to jail when he was finished with his match for that week.

Retirement and death
Curry retired from wrestling in the mid to late 1970s well past turning 60 years old.  He worked as a corrections officer. He died on March 8, 1985.

Championships and accomplishments
Big Time Wrestling
BTW United States Heavyweight Championship (1 time)
Cauliflower Alley Club
Posthumous Award (2004)
Maple Leaf Wrestling
NWA International Tag Team Championship (Toronto version) (1 time) – with Tiger Jeet Singh
Mid-South Sports
NWA Southern Heavyweight Championship (Georgia version) (1 time)
New England Pro Wrestling Hall of Fame
Class of 2013
Southwest Sports, Inc. / NWA Big Time Wrestling
NWA Brass Knuckles Championship (Texas version) (24 times)
NWA International Tag Team Championship (1 time) – with Fred Curry
NWA Texas Heavyweight Championship (1 time)
NWA World Tag Team Championship (Texas version) (1 time) – with Lucas Pertano

References

Further reading

Wild Bull Curry Official Website - including The Walking Riot book written by Flying Fred Curry

External links
 The Curry Family official Website

1913 births
1985 deaths
American male professional wrestlers
American people of Lebanese descent
Professional wrestlers billed from Connecticut
Professional wrestlers from Connecticut
Sportspeople from Hartford, Connecticut
20th-century American male actors
Sportspeople of Lebanese descent
20th-century professional wrestlers
WCWA Brass Knuckles Champions
NWA International Tag Team Champions (Toronto version)
NWA International Tag Team Champions